The European Monitoring Centre for Drugs and Drug Addiction (EMCDDA) is an agency of the European Union located in Lisbon, Portugal, and established in 1993. In June 2022, the Council of the European Union approved a reform of the organization which will lead to an extension of its mandate and a change of name for "European Union Drugs Agency."

The EMCDDA strives to be the "reference point" on drug usage for the European Union's member states, and to deliver "factual, objective, reliable and comparable information" about drug usage, drug addiction and related health complications, including hepatitis, HIV/AIDS and tuberculosis. Though the EMCDDA primarily serves Europe, it also works with other partners, scientists and policy-makers around the world.

Mission and role

The EMCDDA was founded on the principle that independent scientific research is a "vital resource to help Europe understand the nature of its drug problems and better respond to them."

Its stated missions are to:
 Provide the Community and EU Member States with: 'factual, objective, reliable and comparable information at European level concerning drugs and drug addiction and their consequences'
 Collect, register and analyse information on 'emerging trends', particularly in polydrug use, and the combined use of licit and illicit psychoactive substances
 Offer information on best practice in the EU Member States and facilitate exchange of such practice between them

Among the Centre's target groups are policy-makers, who use this information to help formulate coherent national and EU drug strategies. Also served are professionals and researchers working in the drugs field and, more broadly, the European media and general public.

At the heart of the Centre's work is the task of improving the comparability of drug information across Europe and devising the methods and tools required to achieve this. As a result of efforts to date, countries can now view how they fit into the wider European picture and examine common problems and goals. A key feature of the drug phenomenon is its shifting, dynamic nature, and tracking new developments is a central task of the EMCDDA.

Network, reports and partnerships
The Centre obtains information primarily from the "Reitox network": a group of focal points in each of the 28 EU Member States, Norway, the candidate countries to the EU, and at the European Commission. This human and computer network links the national information systems of the 28 Member States, Norway, and their key partners to the EMCDDA. It acts as a practical instrument for the collection and exchange of data and information.

The annual report on the state of the drugs problem in the European Union and Norway and an online statistical bulletin offer a yearly overview of the latest European drug situation and trends. Meanwhile, online country situation summaries provide a pool of national drug-related data.

The EMCDDA works in partnership with non-EU countries as well as with international bodies such as the United Nations International Drug Control Programme, the World Health Organization, the Council of Europe's Pompidou Group, the World Customs Organization, the International Criminal Police Organization (Interpol) and the European Police Office. 

There are also partnerships with non-governmental organizations such as with the Trans-European Drug Information (TEDI) in relation with drug checking services.

Critical Evaluation
Limits to the effectiveness of the organisation have been identified as possible disparity in research standards and rigour between member countries. Efforts to standardise research and data collection are an essential element to maintaining consistency and validity in universal application throughout the European Union. Benefit may be gained also from more detailed and timely monitoring of emerging drug trends in fulfilling the organisation's role of providing pre-emptive responses to drug related issues. An additional challenge to the EMCDD is ensuring limited resources are effectively managed so as not to provide replication of research and risk becoming redundant.

The EMCDDA is proactive in suggesting positive policy change, based on their data collection, to the organisations that can implement these changes. One such change was presented in their 2015 annual report titled 'Alternatives to punishment for drug-using offenders'. Razmadze and colleagues in their review of the EMCDDA's report supported the contention that incarcerating drug users is placing a large financial burden on states as well as doing more harm to drug users and their families. The evidence shows that this option criminalises offenders and promotes recidivism whereas treatment and rehabilitation programs provide the better option to keep both the drug user and the public safer. This alternative approach towards drug users is in keeping with the guidelines by the United Nations 1988 and the Council of the European Union in 2012.

Acknowledgements
In 2013, The American Library Association recognised three EMCDDA’s publications among the notable government documents of 2012.

See also
 European Union
 European Council decisions on designer drugs
 United Nations Office on Drugs and Crime (UNODC)
 Trans-European Drug Information (TEDI)

References

External links

 European Monitoring Centre for Drugs and Drug Addiction
 Health-EU Portal the official public health portal of the European Union

1993 in the European Union
1993 establishments in Portugal
Addiction and substance abuse organizations
Agencies of the European Union
European medical and health organizations
Government agencies established in 1993
Organisations based in Lisbon